Bogaraš can refer to:

 Bogaraš (Senta), a village in Senta municipality, Serbia.
 Bogaraš (Bačka Topola), a village in Bačka Topola municipality, Serbia.